Riri may refer to:

People
Riri Fitri Sari (born 1970) computer engineering professor
Riri Riza (born 1970) Indonesian filmmaker
Rihanna (born 1988; as Robyn Rihanna Fenty) Barbadian singer; nicknamed "RiRi"
Riri (Japanese singer) (born 1999; as Riri Arai)

Fictional characters
Riri Williams (Marvel Comics) aka Ironheart
Riri (folk character) a character from the legend of Tana and Riri
Satō Rirī (videogame character) a character from the faux-Japanese visual novel Katawa Shoujo

Other uses
 "RiRi", a song by Young Thug from his 2016 mixtape Jeffery
 "Riri", a song by Aminé from his 2020 album Limbo
 Riri, 2018 album by Riri

See also

 
 
 RI (disambiguation)